Mount Litera Zee School Moga is a school in Moga, Punjab, India, in which English is the medium of instruction. The school is affiliated with the Central Board of Secondary Education in Delhi.

Mount Litera Zee School Moga was established in 2012 by Zee Learn Ltd in association with Mr. Ashok Gupta, Mr. Gaurav Gupta and Mr. Anuj Gupta. The school has also tied up with British Council to provide spoken English skills to children and is a participant in Green Schools.

Academics
The school is equipped with an online teaching methodology monitored by Zee Learn Ltd through its Mumbai office. The school follows the Central Board of Secondary Education's teaching curriculum through continuous comprehensive evaluation (CCE).

Infrastructure
The school has physics, chemistry, maths, and biology laboratories along with music, dance, and indoor sports. It is also equipped with outdoor badminton, outdoor basketball, football, cricket, volleyball and tennis fields.

Awards and recognition
Mount Litera Zee School Moga has been awarded as Best School in Moga By Brainfeed Magazine and By Green School Awards. The award was presented by HRD minister of India.

References

External links
 Official website of Mount Litera Zee School Moga
 Mount Litera Zee School Moga

Private schools in Punjab, India